George Finch, 9th Earl of Winchilsea  (4 November 1752 – 2 August 1826), was an important figure in the history of cricket. His main contributions to the game were patronage and organisation but Winchilsea, an amateur, was also a very keen player. Finch served with the 87th Foot at the time of the American Revolutionary War from its formation in 1779 to its disbanding in 1783, with the temporary ranks of major and lieutenant-colonel. Finch was the first president of the Royal Institution, and it was through his influence that it received the endorsement of King George III.

Early life

Finch was the son of William Finch, who was in turn the second son, by his second marriage, of Daniel Finch, 2nd Earl of Nottingham (1647–1730), and Charlotte Fermor, daughter of Thomas Fermor, 1st Earl of Pomfret. His sister was Sophia Finch. His father died in 1766 and he inherited the Winchilsea title in 1769 from his childless uncle, Daniel Finch, 8th Earl of Winchilsea and 3rd Earl of Nottingham, together with his estate at Burley-on-the-Hill, Rutland.

In the 1770s Finch was in Florence and appears as one of the recognisable people on the right-hand side of Johann Zoffany's painting the Tribuna of the Uffizi.

Cricketer
A. A. Thomson wrote that Winchilsea "would go anywhere for a game of cricket". He was certainly prolific and is one of the most recorded players of the 18th century, though he was far from being among the best and was already 33 when he was first recorded in a senior match. He is known to have played in more than 130 top-class matches from 1785 to 1804, and records of many other matches have certainly been lost. His level of activity is matched by few of his contemporaries; only Billy Beldham and Tom Walker made a substantially greater number of appearances. Lord Frederick Beauclerk and George Louch were the only amateurs of the time as prolific as Winchilsea, but they were much better players because Winchilsea on the field was something of a liability. His known career batting average was a lowly single figure, despite using a bat that weighed 4 lb 2 oz.

In about 1784, Winchilsea was one of the prime movers in the foundation of the White Conduit Club (WCC), so–called because it played on White Conduit Fields. This was ostensibly an exclusive club that "only gentlemen" might play for, but the club did employ professionals and one of these was the bowler Thomas Lord, a man who was recognised for his business acumen as well as his bowling ability. It was in 1785 that the club first appeared in a first-class match. White Conduit Fields was an open area allowing members of the public, including the rowdier elements, to watch the matches and to voice their opinions on the play and the players. The White Conduit gentlemen were not amused by such interruptions and decided to look for a more private venue of their own.

Winchilsea and Colonel Charles Lennox commissioned Lord to find a new ground and offered him a guarantee against any losses he may suffer in the venture. Lord took a lease from the Portman Estate on some land at Dorset Fields in Marylebone, where Dorset Square is now sited; the ground was prepared and opened in 1787. The first known match began on Monday, 21 May 1787 and was between the White Conduit Club and Middlesex. This was Lord's first ground, originally called the New Ground and, since it was in Marylebone, the WCC on relocating there decided to call themselves Marylebone Cricket Club (MCC). The Earl of Winchilsea was one of its early leading lights.

Personal life

Lord Winchilsea never married and died in 1826. His titles passed to his cousin's son George William Finch-Hatton. His illegitimate son George Finch, to whom he left Burley House, became a politician.

References

Additional Reading
 Buckley, G. B. (FL18): Fresh Light on 18th Century Cricket.
 Haygarth, Arthur (SBnnn): Scores & Biographies, Volume 1.
 Mote, Ashley (GDC): The Glory Days of Cricket.
 Mote, Ashley: John Nyren's "The Cricketers of my Time".
 Thomson, Arthur Alexander: Odd Men In: A Gallery of Cricket Eccentrics (The Pavilion Library, 1985).
 Waghorn, H. T. (WDC): The Dawn of Cricket.

English cricket administrators
English cricketers
English cricketers of 1701 to 1786
English cricketers of 1787 to 1825
Fellows of the Royal Society
09
704
Knights of the Garter
Lord-Lieutenants of Rutland
Marylebone Cricket Club cricketers
Members of the Privy Council of Great Britain
Members of the Privy Council of the United Kingdom
British Army personnel of the American Revolutionary War
87th (Royal Irish Fusiliers) Regiment of Foot officers
1752 births
1826 deaths
Hampshire cricketers
Surrey cricketers
Middlesex cricketers
Kent cricketers
George
English amateur cricketers
White Conduit Club cricketers
Old Etonians cricketers
Surrey and Marylebone Cricket Club cricketers
Cricket patrons
People from Burley, Rutland
East Kent cricketers
Court of George III of the United Kingdom
Grooms of the Stool
Hampshire and Marylebone Cricket Club cricketers
Middlesex and Marylebone Cricket Club cricketers